Lee Minjin (born July 11, 1984), also known as Yi Minjin, is a South Korean female professional Go player of 8 dan rank. and the current women's Go champion of Jeongganjang Cup. Silver at the 2008 World Mind Sports Games.

References

External links 
 Player profile for Lee Minjin
 Lee Minjin defeats Tang Yi and Kato Keiko in Jeongganjang Cup
 Korea Baduk Association profile (in Korean)

1984 births
Living people
South Korean Go players
Female Go players
Asian Games medalists in go
Go players at the 2010 Asian Games
Asian Games gold medalists for South Korea
Medalists at the 2010 Asian Games